Brunia badrana is a moth of the family Erebidae. It was described by Frederic Moore in 1859. It is found on Java and Bali.

References

Lithosiina
Moths described in 1859